Serdar Orazmuhammedowiç Geldiýew (born October 1, 1987) is a professional Turkmen football player currently playing for FC Ahal in Ýokary Liga. He is also a member of Turkmenistan national football team.

Club career
In 2020 he moved to the championship of Malaysia. This is his first foreign club in his career. In 2020 he moved to the championship of Malaysia. This is his first foreign club in his career. On 1 March 2020, Geldiyev made his debut in the 2020 Malaysia Super League in a 0–0 draw against Sabah FA.

In March 2021, Serdar Geldiýew signed a deal at his former club FC Ahal.

International career
He played for the Olympic team of Turkmenistan at the Asian Games 2010 in Guangzhou.

Geldiýew made his debut for the Turkmenistan senior national team in 2008, friendly match against Oman.

Personal life 
He is fluent in Turkmen, Russian and English.

Honours 
 Altyn Asyr FK
Champion of Turkmenistan: 2015, 2016, 2017, 2018, 2019

References

External links
 

1987 births
Living people
Turkmenistan footballers
Turkmenistan international footballers
Association football forwards
Footballers at the 2010 Asian Games
2019 AFC Asian Cup players
Asian Games competitors for Turkmenistan
FC Aşgabat players
FC Ahal players
FC Altyn Asyr players
PDRM FA players
Expatriate footballers in Malaysia
Turkmenistan expatriate sportspeople in Malaysia